Return of the Tiger is a 1978 martial arts Bruceploitation film starring Bruce Li and a sequel to Exit the Dragon, Enter the Tiger.

Synopsis
Chang Hung, who works for a rival organization, and his female partner devise an elaborate plan to take out a heroin ring led by the nefarious Paul the Westerner.

Reception
Eric Reifschneider gave the film 2 out of 5 and said: "I didn't quite like it as much as Exit the Dragon, Enter the Tiger but for fans of these trashy martial arts films Return of the Tiger is a must watch." Comeuppance Reviews gave the film 3 and a half stars and said: "There are other memorable moments as well, making Return of the Tiger a cut above the legion of similar films being released at this time."

References

External links
 
 

1978 films
1978 martial arts films
Hong Kong action films
Kung fu films
Hong Kong martial arts films
Hong Kong sequel films
Bruceploitation films
1970s Hong Kong films